A timeline of the Holocaust is detailed in the events listed below. Also referred to as the Shoah (in Hebrew), the Holocaust was a genocide in which some six million European Jews were killed by Nazi Germany and its World War II collaborators. About 1.5 million of the victims were children. Two-thirds of the nine million Jews who had resided in Europe were murdered. The following timeline has been compiled from a variety of sources including the United States Holocaust Memorial Museum.

Timeline

See also
Timeline of antisemitism
Timeline of Jewish history
Timeline of deportations of French Jews to death camps
Timeline of the Holocaust in Norway
Timeline of Treblinka extermination camp
History of the Jews during World War II

References

 
Holocaust
Holocaust
The Holocaust-related lists